Sam Chang (Chinese name: Shen Leong Chang) is a Taiwanese-American businessman and developer in New York City.

Background
A native of Taiwan, Chang dropped out of high school to help his parents manage a Los Angeles hotel. Prior to becoming a developer in New York City, Chang operated hotels and restaurants in the suburbs of Baltimore, Maryland.  His first New York project was in 1997.

Business
Chang is the chairman of McSam Hotel Group, and is one of the largest hotel developers in New York City.  His company has completed 25 hotels in the five boroughs of New York City, with a stated goal of at least 50.  He currently has 4,000 rooms under development for a variety of national hotel chains. He is the first Asian American to build a high-rise hotel in Manhattan.

Many of Chang's hotels are designed by New York architects Gene Kaufman and Michael Kang. Tritel Construction (of which he is a 50% partner) handles much of the construction.

Chang was honored as a 2007 "Developer of the Year" by Hilton Hotels, for the multiple Hilton properties he is developing in Manhattan and Connecticut.

Investments
Chang has a 7.5 percent stake in Trump Entertainment Resorts.

Personal life
Chang has four children: Danny, Kevin, Jeffrey, and Jennifer.

See also
 Chinese Americans in New York City

References

1960 births
Living people
American construction businesspeople
American hoteliers
American people of Chinese descent
American real estate businesspeople
American restaurateurs
Businesspeople from New York (state)
Businesspeople from Taipei
People from Centre Island, New York
Taiwanese real estate businesspeople
Taiwanese emigrants to the United States